Pákozd is a village in Fejér county, Hungary.

On 29 September 1848, the Hungarian army led by János Móga defeated the superior Croatian army of Josip Jelačić, in the Battle of Pákozd.

Gallery

References

External links 

 Street map 

Populated places in Fejér County